The following highways are numbered 647:

Canada
Alberta Highway 647
 Ontario Highway 647
Saskatchewan Highway 647

United States